The 2016–17 UMass Lowell River Hawks men's basketball team represented the University of Massachusetts Lowell during the 2016–17 NCAA Division I men's basketball season. The River Hawks, led by fourth-year head coach Pat Duquette, played most of their home games at Costello Athletic Center, with five home games at the Tsongas Center. They were members of the America East Conference.

They finished the season 11–20, 5–11 in American East play to finish in sixth place.

UMass Lowell was in the fourth and final year of a transition to Division I and thus ineligible for the postseason, including the America East tournament.

Previous season
The River Hawks finished the 2015–16 season 11–18, 7–9 in America East play to finish in fifth place.

Preseason 
UMass Lowell was picked to finish fifth in the preseason America East poll.

Departures

2016 incoming recruits

Roster

Schedule and results

|-
!colspan=9 style=| Non-conference regular season

|-
!colspan=9 style=| America East regular season

References

UMass Lowell River Hawks men's basketball seasons
UMass Lowell
UMass Lowell River Hawks men's basketball
UMass Lowell River Hawks men's basketball